The following tables compare general and technical information for a number of notable LAN messengers.

General information
Basic general information about the LAN messengers: creator/company, license/price, among others.

Operating system support
The operating systems the messengers can run on without emulators or compatibility layers.

Features
Information on what features each of the clients support.

Note 1: Using Apple's Bonjour protocol

See also
Comparison of cross-platform instant messaging clients
Comparison of instant messaging protocols
Comparison of Internet Relay Chat clients
LAN messenger
Windows Messenger service

References

LAN messengers
LAN messengers
LAN messengers